The  San Miguel Beermen season was the 46th season of the franchise in the Philippine Basketball Association (PBA).

Key dates
March 14: The PBA Season 46 draft was held at the TV5 Media Center in Mandaluyong.

Draft picks

Roster

Philippine Cup

Eliminations

Standings

Game log

|-style="background:#ffcccc"
| 1
| July 18
| Meralco
| L 87–93
| Terrence Romeo (18)
| Moala Tautuaa (10)
| Chris Ross (6)
| Ynares Sports Arena
| 0–1
|-style="background:#ccffcc"
| 2
| July 23
| NLEX
| W 110–93
| CJ Perez (21)
| Arwind Santos (12)
| Chris Ross (6)
| Ynares Sports Arena
| 1–1
|-style="background:#ccffcc"
| 3
| July 25
| NorthPort
| W 88–86
| CJ Perez (18)
| CJ Perez (8)
| Alex Cabagnot (7)
| Ynares Sports Arena
| 2–1
|-style="background:#ccffcc"
| 4
| July 28
| Blackwater
| W 99–80
| June Mar Fajardo (16)
| Arwind Santos (12)
| Arwind Santos (5)
| Ynares Sports Arena
| 3–1

|-style="background:#ffcccc"
| 5
| September 1
| Terrafirma
| L 104–110 (OT)
| Terrence Romeo (28)
| June Mar Fajardo (12)
| Chris Ross (9)
| DHVSU Gym
| 3–2
|-style="background:#ccffcc"
| 6
| September 8
| TNT
| W 83–67
| Marcio Lassiter (19)
| June Mar Fajardo (17)
| Romeo, Ross (4)
| DHVSU Gym
| 4–2
|-style="background:#ccffcc"
| 7
| September 10
| Barangay Ginebra
| W 111–102
| Terrence Romeo (29)
| June Mar Fajardo (10)
| Terrence Romeo (6)
| DHVSU Gym
| 5–2
|-style="background:#ffcccc"
| 8
| September 12
| Rain or Shine
| L 93–95
| Terrence Romeo (20)
| Arwind Santos (12)
| Romeo, Ross (6)
| DHVSU Gym
| 5–3
|-style="background:#ccffcc"
| 9
| September 17
| Phoenix
| W 110–80
| CJ Perez (24)
| June Mar Fajardo (11)
| Chris Ross (8)
| DHVSU Gym
| 6–3
|-style="background:#ffcccc"
| 10
| September 19
| Magnolia
| L 90–100
| CJ Perez (20)
| Fajardo, Perez, Santos (7)
| Chris Ross (5)
| DHVSU Gym
| 6–4
|-style="background:#ccffcc"
| 11
| September 22
| Alaska
| W 101–100
| CJ Perez (20)
| June Mar Fajardo (10)
| June Mar Fajardo (6)
| DHVSU Gym
| 7–4

Playoffs

Bracket

Game log

|-bgcolor=ccffcc
| 1
| September 26
| NorthPort
| W 88–87
| Alex Cabagnot (20)
| Fajardo, Santos (11)
| Marcio Lassiter (9)
| DHVSU Gym
| 1–0
|-bgcolor=ccffcc
| 2
| September 30
| NorthPort
| W 100–95
| CJ Perez (21)
| Arwind Santos (13)
| Chris Ross (6)
| DHVSU Gym
| 2–0

|-bgcolor=ffcccc
| 1
| October 3
| TNT
| L 88–89
| CJ Perez (23)
| June Mar Fajardo (11)
| Fajardo, Ross (4)
| DHVSU Gym
| 0–1
|-bgcolor=ccffcc
| 2
| October 6
| TNT
| W 98–96
| Terrence Romeo (26)
| June Mar Fajardo (10)
| Chris Ross (5)
| DHVSU Gym
| 1–1
|-bgcolor=ffcccc
| 3
| October 8
| TNT
| L 98–115
| Terrence Romeo (22)
| June Mar Fajardo (10)
| June Mar Fajardo (4)
| DHVSU Gym
| 1–2
|-bgcolor=ccffcc
| 4
| October 10
| TNT
| W 116–90
| Moala Tautuaa (25)
| June Mar Fajardo (12)
| Chris Ross (9)
| DHVSU Gym
| 2–2
|-bgcolor=ffcccc
| 5
| October 13
| TNT
| L 90–110
| June Mar Fajardo (23)
| June Mar Fajardo (12)
| Chris Ross (3)
| DHVSU Gym
| 2–3
|-bgcolor=ccffcc
| 6
| October 15
| TNT
| W 103–90
| Moala Tautuaa (24)
| June Mar Fajardo (14)
| Terrence Romeo (6)
| DHVSU Gym
| 3–3
|-bgcolor=ffcccc
| 7
| October 17
| TNT
| L 79–97
| June Mar Fajardo (22)
| June Mar Fajardo (16)
| Fajardo, Ross (3)
| DHVSU Gym
| 3–4

Governors' Cup

Eliminations

Standings

Game log

|-bgcolor=ffcccc
| 1
| December 8
| NLEX
| L 102–114
| Brandon Brown (36)
| Brandon Brown (13)
| Brown, Romeo (3)
| Ynares Sports Arena
| 0–1
|-bgcolor=ffcccc
| 2
| December 10
| Alaska
| L 94–99
| June Mar Fajardo (23)
| June Mar Fajardo (15)
| Terrence Romeo (6)
| Ynares Sports Arena
| 0–2
|-bgcolor=ccffcc
| 3
| December 12
| NorthPort
| W 91–88
| Brandon Brown (24)
| Brandon Brown (12)
| Brown, Romeo (7)
| Ynares Sports Arena
| 1–2
|-bgcolor=ccffcc
| 4
| December 18
| Blackwater
| W 107–88
| CJ Perez (21)
| Brandon Brown (14)
| Brandon Brown (5)
| Smart Araneta Coliseum
| 2–2
|-bgcolor=ccffcc
| 5
| December 26
| Terrafirma
| W 100–88
| Brown, Romeo (23)
| Brandon Brown (10)
| Brown, Perez (5)
| Smart Araneta Coliseum
| 3–2

|-bgcolor=ffcccc
| 6
| February 16, 2022
| TNT
| L 81–96
| June Mar Fajardo (22)
| June Mar Fajardo (14)
| Chris Ross (4)
| Smart Araneta Coliseum
| 3–3
|-bgcolor=ccffcc
| 7
| February 20, 2022
| Barangay Ginebra
| W 110–102
| Orlando Johnson (31)
| Fajardo, Johnson (10)
| Orlando Johnson (8)
| Smart Araneta Coliseum3,347
| 4–3
|-bgcolor=ccffcc
| 8
| February 23, 2022
| Phoenix
| W 104–99
| Orlando Johnson (23)
| June Mar Fajardo (15)
| Orlando Johnson (5)
| Ynares Center
| 5–3
|-bgcolor=ffcccc
| 9
| February 27, 2022
| Magnolia
| L 87–104
| Shabazz Muhammad (27)
| Shabazz Muhammad (17)
| Chris Ross (6)
| Ynares Center3,561
| 5–4

|-bgcolor=ccffcc
| 10
| March 3, 2022
| Rain or Shine
| W 104–100
| Shabazz Muhammad (33)
| Shabazz Muhammad (21)
| Muhammad, Romeo, Ross (6)
| Smart Araneta Coliseum
| 6–4
|-bgcolor=ccffcc
| 11
| March 5, 2022
| Meralco
| W 115–110
| Shabazz Muhammad (57)
| Shabazz Muhammad (19)
| Chris Ross (6)
| Smart Araneta Coliseum
| 7–4

Playoffs

Bracket

Game log

|-bgcolor=ffcccc
| 1
| March 18, 2022
| Meralco
| L 85–100
| Shabazz Muhammad (24) 
| Shabazz Muhammad (15)
| Chris Ross (7)
| Smart Araneta Coliseum
| 0–1

Transactions

Free agency

Signings

Trades

Pre-season

Mid-season

Recruited imports

References

San Miguel Beermen seasons
San Miguel Beermen